Husband for Hire is a 2008 comedy television film that premiered on Oxygen Network on January 24, 2008. Husband for Hire was written and directed by Kris Isacsson, and it starred Nadine Velazquez, Tempestt Bledsoe, Mark Consuelos, Erik Estrada and Mario Lopez.

Cast

Synopsis 

Lola (Nadine Velazquez) attempts to gain her father's trust fund (her father got rich after winning over $90 Million in the New Mexico state lottery years ago) by hiring a hispanic husband, Bo (Mark Consuelos), offering him $100,000 per year if he marries her. Bo accepts, and then departs from his Texas home and returns with Lola to her home in New Mexico. Lola finds out he is in fact Caucasian. Lola's best friend, Nina (Tempestt Bledsoe), and Bo's brother (Jayce Bartok) join the trip, as does Bo's girlfriend, Nikki (Erin Ross), and her clumsy friend, Bubble (Kate Micucci), in secret.

When introduced to Bo, Lola's father, Victor (Erik Estrada),  refuses to allow them to get married, until Bo convinces him by playing an antique guitar. In the meantime, Lola's ex-fiancé, Marco (Mario López), and his secret girlfriend, Simona (Rosa Arredondo), who is also Lola's sister, trying to keep her from having the inheritance, plot against Lola in order to gain the trust fund for themselves. Throughout the course of the story, Lola and Bo actually fall for each other. However, after Simona discovers Bo and Lola have a plot of their own, she uses Nikki to ruin the plot. However, before Nikki could do any damage, Victor and Bo get into an argument, which has both Lola and her father kick Bo out. In response, Lola's ex-fiancé is able to win back Lola's heart, but Lola only agrees for the money.

Later that night, Nikki and Bo discover Simona and Marco's plot and are consequently held prisoner, so they may not warn anyone. However, Bubble finds Nikki and Bo, frees them, and Bo is able to warn Lola. Still angry about the previous night, Lola kicks Bo out once more and proceeds to marry for the money. Fortunately for her, she trusts Bo's words and turns the tables on Simona and Marco, and also turns down the money from her father and departs, claiming that money and greed ruined the family long before that day. She realizes that she was allowing herself to slowly turn into a selfish and greedy person like her father and she sees how she may have been doomed to turn into him. If she didn't wise up and decides to break away from him once and for all.

At the end of the film, Bo is working as a bartender, where Lola manages to find him. They reconcile and show their love for each other once again, and they remain together and happy.

References

External links 
 

2008 romantic comedy films
2008 television films
2008 films
American romantic comedy films
Films set in New Mexico
2000s English-language films
2000s American films